= Dhamaniya, Bhopal =

Dhamaniya
- village
- Location within Madhya Pradesh Location within India
- Coordinates: 23.2586513°N 77.2168036°E
- Country: India
- State: Madhya Pradesh
- District: Bhopal
- Tehsil: Huzur
- Elevation: 523 m (1,716 ft)

Population (2011)
  - Total: 929
- Time zone: UTC+5:30 (IST)
- ISO 3166 code: MP-IN
- 2011 census code: 482474

Dhamaniya is a village in the Bhopal district of Madhya Pradesh, India. It is located in the Huzur tehsil and the Phanda block.

== Demographics ==
According to the 2011 census of India, Dhamaniya has 190 households. The effective literacy rate (i.e. the literacy rate of population excluding children aged 6 and below) is 62.43%.

Demographics (2011 Census)
	Total	Male	Female
Population	929	500	429
Children aged below 6 years	165	90	75
Scheduled caste	169	83	86
Scheduled tribe	53	31	22
Literates	477	310	167
Workers (all)	422	262	160
Main workers (total)	195	163	32
Main workers: Cultivators	81	74	7
Main workers: Agricultural labourers	93	70	23
Main workers: Household industry workers	9	8	1
Main workers: Other	12	11	1
Marginal workers (total)	227	99	128
Marginal workers: Cultivators	16	13	3
Marginal workers: Agricultural labourers	185	70	115
Marginal workers: Household industry workers	19	11	8
Marginal workers: Others	7	5	2
Non-workers	507	238	269
